Astrig Siranossian is a French Armenian cellist born on 19 December .

Biography 

In 2015, she was invited to spend three years as an artist in residence at the Chapelle Musicale Reine Elisabeth in Waterloo, as well as for the Singer-Polignac Foundation.

She has performed at the Philharmonie de Paris, Musikverein in Vienna, KKL Luzern, Basel Casino, Dijon Opera, Flagey in Brussels, Teatro Colón Buenos Aires, Kennedy Center Washington.

Here recordings have been mentioned in mainstream media. Recordings made in 2018 for the Claves Records label include concertos from A. Khachaturyan and K. Penderecki and received 5 diapasons, 5 Classica stars as well as the Clef du mois ResMusica Award.

In 2016, she released an album dedicated to F. Poulenc, G. Faure and Komitas accompanied by pianist Theo Fouchenneret.

She plays a Ruggieri cello from 1676, loaned by the Boubo Music Foundation from Switzerland.

Awards 

 1998: Royaume de la Musique First Prize
 2012: Winner of the Antonio Janigros Music Contest
 2013: Winner of the Banque Populaire Foundation Contest
 2013: 1st Prize and special prizes at the K. Penderecki Contest
 2014: Kiefer Hablitzel Prize
 2016: Musica Prize
 2017: Coup de cœur by the Belgian Television

Discography 

 2012: Celli Monighetti/ LCMS 1202
 2016: Poulenc, Fauré, Komitas; Théo Fouchenneret/Claves Records 1604
 2018: F. Schubert/Evidence
 2018: Cello Concerto Khachaturyan, Penderecki; Sinfonia Varsovia, Adam Klocek/Claves Records 1802

References

External links 
 Astrig Siranossian - Armenian National Music
 

1988 births
Living people
Musicians from Lyon
French women classical cellists
French people of Armenian descent
21st-century French women musicians
21st-century cellists